Schmiedlová is a Slovak surname. Notable people with the surname include:

Anna Karolína Schmiedlová (born 1994), Slovak tennis player, older sister of Kristína
Kristína Schmiedlová (born 1997), Slovak tennis player, younger sister of Anna Karolína

Slovak-language surnames
Slavic-language female forms of surnames